In astroparticle physics, an ultra-high-energy cosmic ray (UHECR) is a cosmic ray with an energy greater than 1 EeV (1018 electronvolts, approximately 0.16 joules), far beyond both the rest mass and energies typical of other cosmic ray particles.

An extreme-energy cosmic ray (EECR) is an UHECR with energy exceeding  (about 8 joule, or the energy of a proton traveling at ≈ % the speed of light), the so-called  Greisen–Zatsepin–Kuzmin limit (GZK limit).  This limit should be the maximum energy of cosmic ray protons that have traveled long distances (about 160 million light years), since higher-energy protons would have lost energy over that distance due to scattering from photons in the cosmic microwave background (CMB). It follows that EECR could not be survivors from the early universe, but are cosmologically "young", emitted somewhere in the Local Supercluster by some unknown physical process. If an EECR is not a proton, but a nucleus with A nucleons, then the GZK limit applies to its nucleons, which carry only a fraction  of the total energy of the nucleus. For an iron nucleus, the corresponding limit would be . However, nuclear physics processes lead to limits for iron nuclei similar to that of protons. Other abundant nuclei should have even lower limits.

These particles are extremely rare; between 2004 and 2007, the initial runs of the Pierre Auger Observatory (PAO) detected 27 events with estimated arrival energies above , that is, about one such event every four weeks in the 3000 km2 area surveyed by the observatory.

There is evidence that these highest-energy cosmic rays might be iron nuclei, rather than the protons that make up most cosmic rays.

The postulated (hypothetical) sources of EECR are known as Zevatrons, named in analogy to Lawrence Berkeley National Laboratory's Bevatron and Fermilab's Tevatron, and therefore capable of accelerating particles to 1 ZeV (1021 eV, zetta-electronvolt).  In 2004 there was a consideration of the possibility of galactic jets acting as Zevatrons, due to diffusive acceleration of particles caused by shock waves inside the jets. In particular, models suggested that shock waves from the nearby M87 galactic jet could accelerate an iron nucleus to ZeV ranges. In 2007, the Pierre Auger Observatory observed a correlation of EECR with extragalactic supermassive black holes at the center of nearby galaxies called active galactic nuclei (AGN). However, the strength of the correlation became weaker with continuing observations. Extremely high energies might be explained also by the centrifugal mechanism of acceleration in the magnetospheres of AGN, although newer results indicate that fewer than 40% of these cosmic rays seemed to be coming from the AGN, a much weaker correlation than previously reported. A more speculative suggestion by Grib and Pavlov (2007, 2008) envisages the decay of superheavy dark matter by means of the Penrose process.

Observational history

The first observation of a cosmic ray particle with an energy exceeding  (16 J) was made by Dr John D Linsley and Livio Scarsi at the Volcano Ranch experiment in New Mexico in 1962.

Cosmic ray particles with even higher energies have since been observed. Among them was the Oh-My-God particle observed by the University of Utah's Fly's Eye experiment on the evening of 15 October 1991 over Dugway Proving Ground, Utah.

The energy of this particle is some 40 million times that of the highest energy protons that have been produced in any terrestrial particle accelerator. However, only a small fraction of this energy would be available for an interaction with a proton or neutron on Earth, with most of the energy remaining in the form of kinetic energy of the products of the interaction (see Collider#Explanation). The effective energy available for such a collision is the square root of double the product of the particle's energy and the mass energy of the proton, which for this particle gives , roughly 50 times the collision energy of the Large Hadron Collider.

Since the first observation, by the University of Utah's Fly's Eye Cosmic Ray Detector, at least fifteen similar events have been recorded, confirming the phenomenon. These very high energy cosmic ray particles are very rare; the energy of most cosmic ray particles is between 10 MeV and 10 GeV.

Ultra-high-energy cosmic ray observatories 

 AGASA – Akeno Giant Air Shower Array in Japan
 Antarctic Impulse Transient Antenna (ANITA) detects ultra-high-energy cosmic neutrinos believed to be caused by ultra-high-energy cosmic ray particles
 Extreme Universe Space Observatory
 GRAPES-3 (Gamma Ray Astronomy PeV EnergieS 3rd establishment) is a project for cosmic ray study with air shower detector array and large area muon detectors at Ooty in southern India.
 High Resolution Fly's Eye Cosmic Ray Detector (HiRes)
 MARIACHI – Mixed Apparatus for Radar Investigation of Cosmic-rays of High Ionization located on Long Island, USA.
 Pierre Auger Observatory
 Telescope Array Project
 Yakutsk Extensive Air Shower Array
 Tunka experiment
 The COSMICi project at Florida A&M University is developing technology for a distributed network of low-cost detectors for UHECR showers in collaboration with MARIACHI.
Cosmic-Ray Extremely Distributed Observatory (CREDO)

Pierre Auger Observatory

Pierre Auger Observatory is an international cosmic ray observatory designed to detect ultra-high-energy cosmic ray particles (with energies beyond 1020 eV). These high-energy particles have an estimated arrival rate of just 1 per square kilometer per century, therefore, in order to record a large number of these events, the Auger Observatory has created a detection area of 3,000 km2 (the size of Rhode Island) in Mendoza Province, western Argentina. The Pierre Auger Observatory, in addition to obtaining directional information from the cluster of water tanks used to observe the cosmic-ray-shower components, also has four telescopes trained on the night sky to observe fluorescence of the nitrogen molecules as the shower particles traverse the sky, giving further directional information on the original cosmic ray particle.

In September 2017, data from 12 years of observations from PAO supported an extragalactic source (outside of Earth's galaxy) for the origin of extremely high energy cosmic rays.

Suggested explanations

Neutron stars
One suggested source of UHECR particles is their origination from neutron stars.  In young neutron stars with spin periods of <10 ms, the magnetohydrodynamic (MHD) forces from the quasi-neutral fluid of superconducting protons and electrons existing in a neutron superfluid accelerate iron nuclei to UHECR velocities.  The magnetic field produced by the neutron superfluid in rapidly rotating stars creates a magnetic field of 108 to 1011 teslas, at which point the neutron star is classified as a magnetar.  This magnetic field is the strongest stable field in the observed universe and creates the relativistic MHD wind believed to accelerate iron nuclei remaining from the supernova to the necessary energy.

Another hypothesized source of UHECRs from neutron stars is during neutron star to strange star combustion.  This hypothesis relies on the assumption that strange matter is the ground state of matter which has no experimental or observational data to support it.  Due to the immense gravitational pressures from the neutron star, it is believed that small pockets of matter consisting of up, down, and strange quarks in equilibrium acting as a single hadron (as opposed to a number of  baryons).  This will then combust the entire star to strange matter, at which point the neutron star becomes a strange star and its magnetic field breaks down, which occurs because the protons and neutrons in the quasi-neutral fluid have become strangelets.  This magnetic field breakdown releases large amplitude electromagnetic waves (LAEMWs).  The LAEMWs accelerate light ion remnants from the supernova to UHECR energies.

"Ultra-high-energy cosmic ray electrons" (defined as electrons with energies of ≥1014eV) might be explained by the Centrifugal mechanism of acceleration in the magnetospheres of the Crab-like Pulsars. The feasibility of electron acceleration to this energy scale in the Crab pulsar magnetosphere is supported by the 2019 observation of ultra-high-energy gamma rays coming from the Crab Nebula, a young pulsar with a spin period of 33 ms.

Active galactic cores
Interactions with blue-shifted cosmic microwave background radiation limit the distance that these particles can travel before losing energy; this is known as the Greisen–Zatsepin–Kuzmin limit or GZK limit.

The source of such high energy particles has been a mystery for many years. Recent results from the Pierre Auger Observatory show that ultra-high-energy cosmic ray arrival directions appear to be correlated with extragalactic supermassive black holes at the center of nearby galaxies called active galactic nuclei (AGN). However, since the angular correlation scale used is fairly large (3.1°) these results do not unambiguously identify the origins of such cosmic ray particles. The AGN could merely be closely associated with the actual sources, for example in galaxies or other astrophysical objects that are clumped with matter on large scales within 100 megaparsecs.

Some of the supermassive black holes in AGN are known to be rotating, as in the Seyfert galaxy MCG 6-30-15 with time-variability in their inner accretion disks. Black hole spin is a potentially effective agent to drive UHECR production, provided ions are suitably launched to circumvent limiting factors deep within the galactic nucleus, notably curvature radiation and inelastic scattering with radiation from the inner disk. Low-luminosity, intermittent Seyfert galaxies may meet the requirements with the formation of a linear accelerator several light years away from the nucleus, yet within their extended ion tori whose UV radiation ensures a supply of ionic contaminants. The corresponding electric fields are small, on the order of 10 V/cm, whereby the observed UHECRs are indicative for the astronomical size of the source. Improved statistics by the Pierre Auger Observatory will be instrumental in identifying the presently tentative association of UHECRs (from the Local Universe) with Seyferts and LINERs.

Other possible sources of the particles
Other possible sources of the UHECR are:
 radio lobes of powerful radio galaxies
 intergalactic shocks created during the epoch of galaxy formation
 hypernovae
 relativistic supernovae
 gamma-ray bursts
 decay products of supermassive particles from topological defects, left over from phase transitions in the early universe
 particles undergoing the Penrose effect.
 Preon stars

Relation with dark matter

It is hypothesized that active galactic nuclei are capable of converting dark matter into high energy protons. Yuri Pavlov and Andrey Grib at the Alexander Friedmann Laboratory for Theoretical Physics in Saint Petersburg hypothesize that dark matter particles are about 15 times heavier than protons, and that they can decay into pairs of heavier virtual particles of a type that interacts with ordinary matter. Near an active galactic nucleus, one of these particles can fall into the black hole, while the other escapes, as described by the Penrose process. Some of those particles will collide with incoming particles; these are very high energy collisions which, according to Pavlov, can form ordinary visible protons with very high energy. Pavlov then claims that evidence of such processes are ultra-high-energy cosmic ray particles.

See also

References

Further reading

External links 
The Highest Energy Particle Ever Recorded The details of the event from the official site of the Fly's Eye detector.
John Walker's lively analysis of the 1991 event, published in 1994
Origin of energetic space particles pinpointed, by Mark Peplow for news@nature.com, published January 13, 2005.

Subatomic particles
Particle physics
Astroparticle physics
Cosmic rays
Unsolved problems in astronomy
Unexplained phenomena